The Great Buddha statue (Daibutsu) is one of the popular stops on the Buddhist pilgrimage and tourist routes in Bodh Gaya, Bihar (India). The statue was designed by V. Ganapati Sthapati and took seven years to complete using the labor of 12,000 stonemasons. It is constructed from a combination of sandstone and red granite blocks. A hollow spiral staircase inside the statue leads from the ground up to the chest. Shelves on the interior walls display 16,300 small bronze images of the Buddha. The Great Buddha statue is located in a garden at the end of Temple Street and is surrounded by smaller sculptures of Buddha's ten principal disciples, five on each side. The Great Buddha was possibly the largest Buddha statue in India at the time and was consecrated on 18 November 1989 by the 14th Dalai Lama. The foundation stone for the statue was laid in 1982.

References

External links

Tourist attractions in Bihar
Colossal Buddha statues
Bodh Gaya
Buddha statues in India
Colossal statues in India
Statues in Bihar